Green Hill Cemetery is a Commonwealth War Graves Commission cemetery located near Suvla Bay, Gallipoli, Turkey.

History

Green Hill and Chocolate Hill were names given by Allied troops taking part in the landing at Suvla Bay in August 1915 to parts of a hill called in Turkish Yilghin Burnu and which rises 52 metres above sea level from the eastern shore of the salt lake. The hill was captured the day after the landing, on 7 August 1915, but remained on the front line until the Allied withdrawal from the area in late December.

The cemetery was built on the hill after the Armistice when graves from the battlefield and small burial grounds nearby were consolidated into it.

References

External links

 
 Green Hill Cemetery, Suvla at Find a Grave

Commonwealth War Graves Commission cemeteries in Gallipoli